Our Lady of Heliopolis Co-Cathedral, also known as the Latin Cathedral of Our Lady of Heliopolis, or the Basilica of the Holy Virgin, is a Roman Catholic church building, located on Al-Ahram Square in the  Heliopolis neighbourhood of Cairo, Egypt. 

Alexandre Marcel designed the cathedral in a Byzantine Revival style, based on the Hagia Sophia. It was completed in 1913. A crypt within the cathedral houses the remains of its financer, Édouard Empain, and his family.

 it follows the Roman Rite under the jurisdiction of the Apostolic Vicariate of Alexandria of Egypt (Vicariatus Apostolicus Alexandrinus). In 2014 members of various Christian denominations gathered at the site to pray for the country's future after the events in the Arab spring.

See also
Roman Catholicism in Egypt

References

External links
 Official website  also 

Roman Catholic cathedrals in Egypt
Cathedrals in Cairo
Neo-Byzantine architecture
Roman Catholic churches completed in 1913
20th-century Roman Catholic church buildings
20th-century churches in Egypt